Robin Gregory Stubbs (born 22 April 1941) is an English former professional footballer, born in Quinton, Birmingham, who played as a centre forward. He made nearly 400 appearances and scored 170 goals in the Football League playing for Birmingham City, Torquay United (in two separate spells) and Bristol Rovers.

While with Birmingham, Stubbs played in the early rounds of their 1958–60 and 1960–61 campaigns in the Inter-Cities Fairs Cup, but not in either final. At the age of 22 he joined Torquay for what was then their club record fee of £6,000. Over the following six seasons he scored at a rate of better than a goal every two games, and was the Torquay fans' choice in the 2007 PFA Fans' Favourites poll.

Stubbs was formerly married to Anthea Redfern, who went on to marry Bruce Forsyth and assist him on the BBC game-show The Generation Game.

On 6 January 2020 Torquay United announced that Stubbs had been appointed to the board as an Honorary Life President of the club.

References

1941 births
Living people
Footballers from Birmingham, West Midlands
English footballers
Association football forwards
Birmingham City F.C. players
Torquay United F.C. players
Bristol Rovers F.C. players
English Football League players